Camarotoscena speciosa is a species of true bug belonging to the family Liviidae.

It is native to Europe.

References

Liviidae